"Search and Destroy" is a song by American rock band the Stooges, recorded for the group's third album Raw Power (1973). Lead singer Iggy Pop said that the title was derived from a column heading in a Time article about the Vietnam War. In 1997, "Search and Destroy" (along with the rest of the songs on Raw Power) was remixed and remastered by Pop and Bruce Dickinson. The result was far more aggressive and stripped down than the original release, which had been mixed by David Bowie.

In 2004, Rolling Stone ranked "Search and Destroy" at No. 468 on their list of "The 500 Greatest Songs of All Time". In 2009, it was named the 49th best hard rock song of all time by VH1.  The song has also been characterized as garage rock, glam rock and proto-punk.

Influence
In a song review for AllMusic,  Bill Janovitz commented on the song's influence:

Janovitz also notes that the song has become a popular live punk performance piece for bands such as Red Hot Chili Peppers, Sid Vicious, the Dictators, and KMFDM.

Covers
Finnish band Smack played the song in their gig at Husulan Kasino 26th of September 1986 and it has been recorded on their live album Live Desire.

Former Chemlab vocalist Jared Louche covered the song with The Aliens for his 1999 solo debut Covergirl.

Emanuel covered the song for the Tony Hawk's American Wasteland original soundtrack in 2005.

Skunk Anansie covered the song for the Sucker Punch soundtrack.

Industrial metal band Ministry, joined by guitarist Billy Morrison and bassist David Ellefson, covered the track on their 2021 album Moral Hygiene.

Indie rock band Florence and the Machine covered the song on the deluxe edition of their 2022 album Dance Fever.

Red Hot Chili Peppers covered the song on  The Beavis and Butt-Head Experience

Personnel
Iggy Pop – vocals
James Williamson – guitar
Ron Asheton – bass guitar
Scott Asheton – drums

References

1973 singles
The Stooges songs
Songs written by Iggy Pop
Song recordings produced by David Bowie
Columbia Records singles
Glam rock songs